Kairėnai Manor was a residential manor in Kairėnai near Vilnius, Lithuania. Only a few buildings and park survived until nowadays. Currently its territory is occupied by the Botanical Garden of Vilnius University.

References

Manor houses in Lithuania
Classicism architecture in Lithuania